No. 247 Squadron was formerly a squadron of the Royal Air Force. It was also known as No. 247 (China British) Squadron in recognition of the donations made by the British  communities of the foreign concessions established on the Chinese coast. The financial gift to provide two fighter squadrons also included the badge in the form of a scroll with Chinese characters Cheu Feng meaning "fierce wind" or Hurricane, and the motto "Rise from the East". The squadron was heavily involved in air operations during the Second World War, and the defence of the United Kingdom during the early years of the Cold War.

History

Formation and early history (1918–1919)
No. 247 Squadron was first formed in the First World War on 20 August 1918 by the amalgamation of No. 336 and 337 Flights of the Royal Naval Air Service. The squadron was equipped with Felixstowe F2A flying boats and its role was reconnaissance and anti-submarine work in the North Sea. With the cessation of hostilities, the squadron was disbanded on 22 January 1919.

The Second World War
Formed from the Shetland Fighter Flight No. 247 Squadron was reformed at Roborough (Plymouth) on 1 August 1940, flying Gloster Gladiator biplanes. Tasked with the defence of the south west of England including the ports of Plymouth and Falmouth, the squadron's first action came on 25 September 1940, when a force of 24 Dornier Do 17s escorted by 12 Messerschmitt Bf 110s flew over the English Channel from France and crossed the coast at Start Point, heading towards Plymouth. Four of the squadron's Gladiators attempted an attack, but the formation was eventually broken up by Hurricanes from Exeter. Two Dorniers managed to reach the target, and bombs fell into the harbour. Too fast for the Gladiators to get into position, the raiders made their escape. The Luftwaffe's tactics changed to night bombing of Britain during the autumn of 1940, and the Gladiators adopted a night defence role. Although several visual night interceptions were made (aided by ground control radar), the obsolete Gladiator had no success against the heavy bombing of the city of Plymouth.

No. 247 Squadron was re-equipped with the Hawker Hurricane on 24 December 1940, and continued to operate by day and night. Due to the poor airfield conditions a detachment was sent to RAF St Eval with its better facilities. Even though the Hurricane was an improvement over the Gladiator, results in night interception were poor and the squadron made little impact in defending Plymouth and Exeter during the Blitz. After a short move to RAF Portreath, the squadron moved to RAF Predannack on 18 June 1941. It was from there on 7 July that the squadron's first 'kill' was made when a Junkers Ju 88 was shot down during a night raid on Falmouth. Various methods were adopted to improve the night fighting capability, including operating in formation with Turbinlite aircraft of 1457 Flight. This bizarre concept consisted of a high powered searchlight attached to the nose of a radar fitted Douglas Havoc, with the intention of illuminating the target, to enable the Hurricane to make its attack. There are no known instances of this being a success. The Hurricane was also tried with radar equipment, but soon heavier, improved performance machines like the Bristol Beaufighter replaced the aircraft in the night-fighting role. From September 1942 until after the war, the unit was stationed at RAF High Ercall in Shropshire, where the local parish church has a Roll of Honour to squadron members who died in the war.

As well as continuing its night defence role the squadron was involved in early offensive "intruder" attacks against Luftwaffe aerodromes in northern France. When the Hawker Typhoon replaced the Hurricane, these type of operations continued in daylight. No. 247 was involved in attacks prior to and including D-Day. Targets included transport systems, and weapon emplacements as well as providing close air support to ground forces. On 27 June 1944, the squadron moved to Coulombs in Normandy, beginning the subsequent drive through France, Belgium, the Netherlands and into Germany. Augmented memoirs of one of the squadron armourers for this period are recorded in Nash (2010).

Post war
After the war, the squadron was re-equipped briefly with the Typhoon's successor, the Hawker Tempest. However the radical change of equipment came in March 1946 when the squadron became the first unit to operate the de Havilland Vampire jet fighter. No.247 Squadron formed part of the UK's air defence during the early Cold War years. The Vampire was replaced by the improved version of the Gloster Meteor, and then the successful Hawker Hunter fighter.

Missile defence
Defence cuts and a change of strategy for the RAF in the late 1950s led to the squadron's second disbandment in 1957. In 1960, the squadron reformed as a Bristol Bloodhound surface-to-air missile unit, before being disbanded for the final time on 31 December 1963.

Post RAF
The squadron number since it final disbandment from the RAF was adopted by the Air Training Corps and is currently based in Ashton-under-Lyne.

Squadron association
An association of former serving members of the squadron was formed in 1987 and continues to the present day. An annual reunion is held, normally in September.

Aircraft operated

See also
List of Royal Air Force aircraft squadrons

References

Bibliography

 Bowyer, Michael J.F and John D.R. Rawlings. Squadron Codes, 1937–56. Cambridge, Cambridgeshire, UK: Patrick Stephens Ltd., 1979. .
 Flintham, Vic and Andrew Thomas. Combat Codes: A Full Explanation and Listing of British, Commonwealth and Allied Air Force Unit Codes Since 1938. Shrewsbury, Shropshire, UK: Airlife Publishing Ltd., 2003. .
 Halley, James J. The Squadrons of the Royal Air Force & Commonwealth, 1918–1988. Tonbridge, Kent, UK: Air-Britain (Historians) Ltd., 1988. .
 Jefford, C.G. RAF Squadrons: A Comprehensive Record of the Movement and Equipment of all RAF Squadrons and their Antecedents since 1912. Shrewsbury, Shropshire, UK: Airlife Publishing Ltd., 2001. .
 Marchant, David John. Rise from the East: The Story of No.247 (China British) Squadron Royal Air Force, Tunbridge Wells, Kent, UK: Air-Britain (Historians) Ltd., 1996. .
 Nash, John C., Across an Ocean and Time: The World as Seen by Harry Nash, Ottawa, Canada: Nash Information Services Inc., 2010.  . Available freely at https://archive.org/details/AcrossAnOceanAndTime_201411}
 Rawlings, John D.R. Fighter Squadrons of the RAF and their Aircraft. London: Macdonald and Jane's (Publishers) Ltd., 1969 (new edition 1976, reprinted 1978). .

External links

 The history of No 247 squadron at raf.mod.uk
 The history of No 247 squadron at rafweb's 'Air of Authority'
 Aircraft and markings of no. 247 squadron

247 Squadron
Military units and formations established in 1918
1918 establishments in the United Kingdom